The 2013 DFL-Supercup was the fourth DFL-Supercup, an annual football match contested by the winners of the previous season's Bundesliga and DFB-Pokal competitions. It featured Bayern Munich, winners of the 2012–13 Bundesliga and the 2012–13 DFB-Pokal, and, as a result of the former winning both competitions, the Bundesliga runners-up Borussia Dortmund. The match was hosted by Dortmund at the Signal Iduna Park on 27 July 2013. The match took place two months after the same teams played each other in the 2013 UEFA Champions League Final.

Borussia Dortmund won the match 4–2. It was their fourth triumph in the Supercup, which equalled the then-record held by Bayern Munich.

Teams
In the following table, matches until 1996 were in the DFB-Supercup era, since 2010 were in the DFL-Supercup era.

Match

Details

References

2013
2013–14 in German football
Borussia Dortmund matches
FC Bayern Munich matches
2013–14 in German football cups